Elections to the United States House of Representatives in Florida for two seats in the 56th Congress were held November 8, 1898

Background
The previous election year had seen a total of five parties contesting Florida's two seats, including the Republican Party, which had been absent in 1892 and 1894.  Both seats were won by the Democratic incumbents by a large majority.  The previous three elections had seen Populist candidates as well, but, mirroring the national decline of that party, there were no Populist candidates in 1896.

Election results

See also
1898 United States House of Representatives elections

References

1898
Florida
United States House of Representatives